The Satanic Rituals is a book by Anton Szandor LaVey published in 1972 by Avon Books as a companion volume to The Satanic Bible. The book outlines nine rituals and ceremonies intended for group performance, with an introductory essay to each. Some of the rites presented are inspired by other groups, such as the Yezidis, Freemasons, Knights Templar and Order of the Illuminati, and some inspired by fictional works. 

The book includes the child baptism ritual LaVey used for his youngest daughter Zeena at the first publicly recorded Church of Satan baptism.

Rites outlined
 Le Messe Noire
 The Ceremony of the Stifling Air
 Das Tirdrama
 Die elektrischen Vorspiele 
 Homage to Tchort
 The Statement of Shaitan and Wordless Rite of Dedication
 The Ceremony of the Nine Angles
 The Call to Cthulhu
 The Baptisms: Adult Rite and Children's Ceremony

References 

1972 non-fiction books
English-language books
Works by Anton LaVey
Avon (publisher) books